Manmohan Krishna (26 February 1922 – 3 November 1990) was a popular Indian film actor and director, who worked in Hindi films for four decades, mostly as a character actor. He started his career as a professor in Physics and held master's degree in physics. He anchored the radio show Cadbury's Phulwari, a singing contest. Many people don't know that Manmohan Krishna sang his first song, 'Jhat khol de' in Afsar (1950), a Dev Anand film with music by S.D. Burman.

He was a favourite with the Chopra brothers and played small or large roles in movies directed and/or produced by them. Deewar, Trishul, Daag, Hamraaz, Joshila, Kanoon, Sadhna, Kaala Patthar, Dhool Ka Phool, Waqt and Naya Daur are some examples.

He worked in nearly 250 films, notably Naya Daur (1957), Khandan (1965), Sadhana (1958), Waqt (1965) and Hamraaz (1967). He won acclaim for his work in Bees Saal Baad (1962) and won the Filmfare Award for Best Supporting Actor for his role as Abdul Rasheed in Dhool Ka Phool (1960), where the song epitomizing Nehruvian secularism, Tu Hindu banega na Musalman banega, insaan ki aulaad hai, insaan banega was picturised on him. Beside these, he also acted in 12 Punjabi films, played a pivotal role in K. A. Abbas's Shehar Aur Sapna (1963), which won the National Film Award for Best Feature Film, and acted in the first Indo-Soviet co-production Pardesi (1957), which was nominated for the Golden Palm at 1958 Cannes Film Festival.

Later in his career he directed the hit film for Yash Raj Films, Noorie (1979), for which he was also nominated for Filmfare Award for Best Director.

He died at Lokmanya Tilak Hospital, Mumbai at the age of 68 in 1990. His son Dr Ram Chaddha is a famours spine surgeon at Lilavati Hospital in Mumbai

Selected filmography

References

External links
 

Indian male film actors
1922 births
1990 deaths
People from Lahore
Male actors in Hindi cinema
Hindi-language film directors
Filmfare Awards winners
20th-century Indian male actors